Liskinsky (masculine), Liskinskaya (feminine), or Liskinskoye (neuter) may refer to:
Liskinsky District, a district of Voronezh Oblast, Russia
Liskinskoye, a rural locality (a selo) in Voronezh Oblast, Russia